Archibald Campbell (15 August 1904 – c. 1980) was an English footballer who made 58 appearances in the Football League playing for Aston Villa and Lincoln City. He played as a right half or centre half. He was a nephew of Scotland international and Celtic and Aston Villa player John Campbell.

References

1904 births
1980 deaths
People from Crook, County Durham
Footballers from County Durham
English footballers
Association football wing halves
Spennymoor United F.C. players
Aston Villa F.C. players
Lincoln City F.C. players
Dundee F.C. players
Scottish Football League players
Craghead United F.C. players
English Football League players
Place of death missing
English people of Scottish descent